Tharushah (Sindhi: ٺارو شاھ جنڪشن ريلوي اسٽيشن) is  located in Tharu Shah Town, Sindh, Pakistan.

See also
 List of railway stations in Pakistan
 Pakistan Railways

References

Railway stations in Naushahro Feroze District
Defunct railway stations in Pakistan